was a Japanese scholar, known particularly for his work on the Omoro sōshi, a written collection of songs and poems which constitutes an oral history of Okinawa and the Ryūkyū Kingdom.

Nakahara was born in Nakazato magiri, on Kumejima. He attended the Okinawa Normal School, and Hiroshima Normal High School, before going on to teach at various schools in Tokyo, Shizuoka prefecture, and elsewhere.

He first began research into Okinawan history around the age of 50. After the end of World War II, he researched the native Ryukyuan religion, and produced a paper which drew great praise from Yanagita Kunio, widely regarded today as the father of Japanese ethnology. He would go on to produce a number of papers on topics relating to Okinawan history, omoro, and ethnology, as well as a middle school textbook entitled .

Selected works

References

"Nakahara Zenchū." Okinawa konpakuto jiten (沖縄コンパクト事典, "Okinawa Compact Encyclopedia"). Ryukyu Shimpo (琉球新報). 1 March 2003. Accessed 12 October 2009.

1890 births
1964 deaths
Japanese ethnologists
Japanese folklorists
People from Okinawa Prefecture